Vima Mică is a commune in Maramureș County, Transylvania, Romania. It is composed of seven villages: Aspra, Dealu Corbului, Jugăstreni (Jávoros), Peteritea (Petőrét), Sălnița (Erdőszállás), Vima Mare (Tordavilma), and Vima Mică.

The commune is located in the southwestern part of the county, on the border with Sălaj County.

References

Communes in Maramureș County
Localities in Transylvania